The Night or Al-lail is a Syrian feature drama film by director Mohamed Malas. The film is set in Quneitra and is about the Arab-Israeli conflict. In 1993 it became the first Syrian feature to be played at the New York Film Festival.

Awards
Carthage Film Festival - Tanit d'Or, 1992.

References

External links
 

1992 films
Syrian drama films
1990s Arabic-language films
Films directed by Mohammad Malas
1992 drama films